The Kecskés is a river in Nógrád County, in northern Hungary. It originates at 490 metres above sea level in the Cserhát range, southeast of Mátraverebély, and flows northward to Bátonyterenye, where it joins with the Zagyva.

Settlements on the banks

 Mátraverebély
 Bátonyterenye

Rivers of Hungary